This article refers to crime in the American state of Texas.

State statistics

In 2014 there were 923,348 crimes reported in Texas, including 1,184 murders and 8,236 rapes.

Policing 

In 2008, Texas had 1,913 state and local law enforcement agencies. Those agencies employed a total of 96,116 staff. Of the total staff, 59,219 were sworn officers (defined as those with general arrest powers).

Police ratio 

In 2008, Texas had 244 police officers per 100,000 residents.

According to the Texas Commission on Law Enforcement (TCOLE), the state average for police officers per 100,000 residents in Texas is 241 as of 2021. However, the ratio can vary among different cities and counties in Texas.

Capital punishment laws

Capital punishment is applied under Texas state law for capital murder if the perpetrator is 18 years of age and older and the prosecutor seeks the death penalty.

The federal death penalty may also be used in certain circumstances.

Incarceration

In 1974 the Texas Department of Corrections (TDC), since merged into the Texas Department of Criminal Justice (TDCJ), had about 17,000 prisoners; 44% were black, 39% were non-Hispanic white, 16% were Hispanic and Latino, and 1% were of other races. 96% were male and 4% were female. At the time all 14 prison units of the TDC were in Southeast Texas.

In 1974 the Federal Bureau of Prisons (BOP) operated four federal prisons in Texas: FCI Texarkana, FCI Seagoville, FPC Bryan (for women), and FCI La Tuna. These prisons had a combined population of about 2,300.

See also 

Crime in the United States
Crime in Houston
Law of Texas

References

Further reading
Harnsberger, R. Scott. A Guide to Sources of Texas Criminal Justice Statistics [North Texas Crime and Criminal Justice Series, no.6]. Denton: University of North Texas Press, 2011.